Syllepte amando is a moth in the family Crambidae. It was described by Pieter Cramer in 1779. It is found in French Guiana, Suriname, Argentina, Costa Rica, Panama and Cuba.

References

Moths described in 1779
amando
Moths of Central America
Moths of the Caribbean
Moths of South America